Eugène Moke Motsüri (25 March 1916 – 6 April 2015) was a Democratic Republic of the Congo prelate of the Roman Catholic Church. He was one of the oldest living bishops and the oldest bishop in Africa until his death on 6 April 2015.

Motsüri was born in Mongobele, part of the Belgian Congo at the time, and ordained as a priest on 9 June 1946. Motsüri was appointed Auxiliary bishop of the Archdiocese of Kinshasa and titular bishop of Lestona on 1 September 1970. Motsüri stayed on as Auxiliary bishop of the Archdiocese of Kinshasa until his retirement on 11 May 1991.

External links
Catholic-Hierarchy

20th-century Roman Catholic bishops in the Democratic Republic of the Congo
21st-century Roman Catholic bishops in the Democratic Republic of the Congo
1916 births
2015 deaths
Roman Catholic bishops of Kinshasa
21st-century Democratic Republic of the Congo people